Austroaeschna anacantha is a species of dragonfly in the family Telephlebiidae, 
known as the western darner. 
It is found in south-western Australia, where it inhabits rivers and streams.

Austroaeschna anacantha is a medium-sized to large dark dragonfly with pale markings. It appears similar to the multi-spotted darner, Austroaeschna multipunctata, which occurs in eastern Australia.

Gallery

See also
 List of dragonflies of Australia

References

Telephlebiidae
Odonata of Australia
Endemic fauna of Australia
Taxa named by Robert John Tillyard
Insects described in 1908